The Sony α 230 (DSLR-A230) is Sony's entry-level digital single-lens reflex camera (DSLR). The 10.2 megapixel α230 is available in the United States in two kit versions, one with a DT 18-55mm SAM (smooth-autofocus-motor) Sony lens and the other with the same DT 18-55mm SAM lens and a DT 55-200mm SAM Sony lens. The single lens kit is $449.99 (as of Jan. 1, 2010)  and the two lens kit is for $649.99 (as of Jan. 1, 2010).

The Sony α230 has a 9-point AF system and takes all Sony α/Minolta AF mount lenses. The 10.2 megapixel APS-C (23.6 mm × 15.8 mm) sized CCD sensor has a max ISO of 3200, however when using ISO 800 the photos start to get noisy and 1600 and 3200 have very bad noise. The Sony α230 has a BIONZ images processor and can take approximately 7.5 frames per second. The Sony α230 includes Creative Style, or preset color settings; BRAVIA Sync with a built in HDMI plug, and anti-dust technology. The Sony α230's anti-dust system is a charge protection coating on a low pass filter and image-sensor shift mechanism. The α230 also features Sony's SteadyShot INSIDE in-body stabilization.

The Sony α230 takes the Sony NP-FH50 rechargeable battery and can take about 510 photos on a full charge (according to Sony). The viewfinder on the Sony α230 has a 95% field of view and has .83x magnification (with a 50 mm lens at infinity) is apparently better than its older brother, the Sony α350 which is almost the same camera except its bigger-tilt screen and live preview.

A disadvantage to the Sony α230 is its proprietary hot shoe, or where an external flash unit attaches. The Sony α230, like all other Sony Alpha DSLRs, has the iISO flash shoe.

The Sony α230 officially succeeded the Sony α 200, however the α 230 seems to be targeted towards a more entry-level market as it is much lighter, several features have been removed and direct buttons to several options have been replaced with on-screen menus, unlike the α200 which uses CompactFlash memory cards, the α230 will take either a Memory Stick PRO Duo or an SD/SDHC card.

The camera weighs approximately  without the battery, memory card, lens and other accessories and has the approximate dimensions of 128 mm × 97 mm × 67.5 mm (W/H/D).

The Sony α230 has a standard USB 2.0 port along with its mini HDMI port. The camera sends a review image to HDMI output immediately after taking a photo. There is no need to switch to playback mode to review.

The flash on the α230 is a standard pop-up with a recycling time of approximately 4 seconds. The hot shoe is, like most other Sony Alpha camera, a proprietary iISO.

The Sony α230 has a capability to work with infrared remote control and also wired remote. Remote control is sold separately, and is enabled through the Drive mode menu by selecting 'Remote Commander'.

The Sony α230 has a capability to take power from AC Power Supply. Power supply is sold separately.

Sony discontinued the α230 in May 2010, replacing it with the α290.

References

External links

230